Martín Ezequiel Cañete (born 17 June 1999) is an Argentine professional footballer who plays as a midfielder for Unión Santa Fe.

Professional career
Cañete joined Unión in January 2020, on loan from Boca Juniors. Cañete made his professional debut with Unión Santa Fe in a 0-0 Argentine Primera División tie with Central Córdoba on 24 February 2020.

International career
Cañete represented the Argentina U20s at the 2018 South American Games.

Personal life
Cañete is the cousin of the footballer Marcelo Cañete.

References

External links
 

1999 births
Living people
Sportspeople from Misiones Province
Argentine footballers
Argentina youth international footballers
Association football forwards
Unión de Santa Fe footballers
Argentine Primera División players